Brian Martin (born 24 February 1963 in Bellshill) is a Scottish former footballer who played as a central defender, best known for his seven-year spell at Motherwell.

Club career
Martin began his career in the Scottish lower leagues with Albion Rovers and Stenhousemuir. He then dropped back into the Junior grade with Shotts Bon Accord for three years before joining second-tier Falkirk in 1985. In his first season with the Bairns the club achieved promotion to the top division, and maintained their status in the second.

In 1987 Martin moved to Hamilton Academical, and in his single campaign there he again helped the Accies win promotion, this time as champions. By then he had already  moved on to St Mirren, where he stayed for three seasons in the Scottish Premier Division before being signed by fellow top-level club Motherwell in November 1991 for £175,000. He made 237 appearances for Motherwell between 1991 and 1998, and was part of the side which finished league runners-up in 1995. 
 
Martin left Motherwell in 1998 and had spells with Stirling Albion and Partick Thistle before retiring from the professional leagues in 2000, aged 37. He returned to local Junior football, appearing for Lanark United, Stonehouse Violet, Shotts - two decades after his first spell there, and Cambuslang Rangers, also playing the occasional game for the 'Motherwell Legends' team.

International career
While playing for Motherwell, Martin earned two caps for the Scotland national team (making his debut aged 32) in the 1995 Kirin Cup matches against Ecuador and Japan alongside clubmates Rab McKinnon and Paul Lambert. He also represented the B side on three occasions in the same era.

References

External links

International stats at Londonhearts.com

 

Living people
1963 births
Footballers from Bellshill
Scottish footballers
Scotland international footballers
Scotland B international footballers
Shotts Bon Accord F.C. players
Lanark United F.C. players
Stonehouse Violet F.C. players
Cambuslang Rangers F.C. players
Albion Rovers F.C. players
Stenhousemuir F.C. players
Falkirk F.C. players
Hamilton Academical F.C. players
St Mirren F.C. players
Motherwell F.C. players
Stirling Albion F.C. players
Partick Thistle F.C. players
Scottish Football League players
Association football central defenders
Scotland junior international footballers
Scottish Junior Football Association players